is a Japanese sprinter holding the Japanese record of 9.95 in the 100m.

He won the bronze medal in the medley relay at the 2009 World Youth Championships in Athletics.

In the 2016 Olympic Games in Rio de Janeiro, Yamagata was part of the 4 × 100 m relay team for Japan, which took the silver medal in the final.

He served as the captain of Japan's team at the Tokyo 2020 Summer Olympics.

Personal bests

Records
100 metres
Current japanese record holder - 9.95 s (wind: +2.0 m/s) (Tottori, 6 June 2021)
Former Japanese junior record holder – 10.23 s (wind: +1.8 m/s) (Yamaguchi, 8 October 2011)
4 × 100 m relay
Current Asian and Japanese record holder – 37.60 s (relay leg: 1st) (Rio de Janeiro, 19 August 2016)
Current Japanese university record holder – 38.44 s (relay leg:1st) (Tianjin, 9 October 2013)
60 metres (Indoor)
Former Japanese junior record holder – 6.71 s (Osaka, 5 February 2011)

 with Shōta Iizuka, Yoshihide Kiryū, and Asuka Cambridge
 with Shōta Iizuka, Asuka Cambridge, and Kazuma Ōseto

Competition record

1Did not start in the final
2Did not finish in the final

National Championship

References

External links
 
 Ryōta Yamagata at JAAF 

1992 births
Living people
Japanese male sprinters
Olympic male sprinters
Olympic athletes of Japan
Olympic silver medalists for Japan
Olympic silver medalists in athletics (track and field)
Athletes (track and field) at the 2012 Summer Olympics
Athletes (track and field) at the 2016 Summer Olympics
Athletes (track and field) at the 2020 Summer Olympics
Medalists at the 2016 Summer Olympics
Asian Games gold medalists for Japan
Asian Games silver medalists for Japan
Asian Games bronze medalists for Japan
Asian Games medalists in athletics (track and field)
Athletes (track and field) at the 2014 Asian Games
Athletes (track and field) at the 2018 Asian Games
Medalists at the 2014 Asian Games
Medalists at the 2018 Asian Games
Universiade silver medalists for Japan
Universiade medalists in athletics (track and field)
Medalists at the 2013 Summer Universiade
World Athletics Championships athletes for Japan
Japan Championships in Athletics winners
Keio University alumni
Oath takers at the Olympic Games
21st-century Japanese people